Wang Shuang (born 23 January 1995) is a Chinese footballer who plays for Racing Louisville FC in the National Women's Soccer League (NWSL).

Club career
Wang Shuang was spotted by scouts of WK-League side Daejeon Sportstoto while preparing for the 2013 National Games with provincial side Hubei. On 3 July 2013, it was announced that she had signed a contract with the club and would join after the 2013 EAFF Women's East Asian Cup.
In her first season with the club, Wang helped Sportstoto reach the Korean Women's FA Cup final and was awarded the most valuable player award for scoring six goals in five appearances. The initial progress was halted due to her commitments with the 2013 National Games and the Chinese women's national team.

In December 2013, she signed a one-year contract with the club and was joined by Wu Haiyan. In 2015, she returned to Wuhan Jianghan University to prepare for the 2015 FIFA Women's World Cup. On 31 December 2015, Wang transferred to Chinese Women's Super League side Dalian Quanjian despite interest from several FA WSL clubs.

On 3 August 2018, Wang transferred to Division 1 Féminine club Paris Saint-Germain signing a two-year contract. On 5 July 2019, Wang left the club by mutual consent and returned to Wuhan Jianghan University once again.

On 10 August 2022, Wang signed with NWSL club Racing Louisville FC through the 2023 season. She debuted against Houston Dash on 12 August 2022, as a 60th-minute substitute.

International career
Wang represented China PR U-17 at the age of 12. In 2012, she was included for the U-20 side at the FIFA U-20 Women's World Cup.

Wang was called up to the China women's national football team for the first time in 2013 making her debut on 12 January 2013 in a 1–0 loss against Canada. After the match, then-manager Hao Wei described the then 17-year-old as a player "of great potential". On 21 July 2013, she made her full international debut in a 2–0 loss against Japan in the 2013 EAFF Women's East Asian Cup.

Wang was the 2013 AFC U-19 Women's Championship's second top goalscorer. She was later nominated for the AFC Young Player of the Year award.

Wang was used largely as a substitute at the 2015 FIFA Women's World Cup, was selected for the 2015 EAFF Women's East Asian Cup and started 10 consecutive international matches to end the year 2015. She was the top goalscorer at the 2015 Yongchuan International Tournament.

She made her 100th appearance for the team China PR on 7 November 2019 in a 2–0 win against New Zealand during the 2019 Yongchuan International Tournament.

At the 2020 Olympics she scored four goals in China's group game against Zambia.

Wang Shuang scored five goals in the 2022 AFC Women's Asian Cup to help the team China won the title.

International goals

Personal life
Writing for The Players' Tribune in June 2019, Wang spoke about her disconnect with her parents, how she was raised by her uncle and aunt growing up and her struggles with impostor syndrome.

Honours
Dalian W.F.C.
Chinese Women's Super League: 2016, 2017

Wuhan Jianghan University F.C.
Chinese Women's Super League: 2020, 2021

China
AFC Women's Asian Cup: 2022
Four Nations Tournament: 2014, 2016, 2017, 2018
Yongchuan International Tournament: 2015, 2016

Individual
AFC Women's Footballer of the Year: 2018
Chinese Women's Footballer of the Year: 2017, 2018, 2019
Korean Women's FA Cup Most Valuable Player: 2013
Yongchuan International Tournament Top Goalscorer: 2015

References

External links
 

1995 births
Living people
Chinese women's footballers
China women's international footballers
2015 FIFA Women's World Cup players
Footballers at the 2016 Summer Olympics
Chinese expatriate sportspeople in South Korea
Expatriate women's footballers in South Korea
Footballers from Wuhan
WK League players
Women's association football forwards
Olympic footballers of China
Dalian Quanjian F.C. players
Chinese Women's Super League players
Racing Louisville FC players
National Women's Soccer League players
Chinese expatriate sportspeople in the United States
Expatriate women's soccer players in the United States
Footballers at the 2018 Asian Games
Asian Games silver medalists for China
Asian Games medalists in football
Medalists at the 2018 Asian Games
2019 FIFA Women's World Cup players
FIFA Century Club
Footballers at the 2020 Summer Olympics
21st-century Chinese women